Justin S. Rhodes is an American neuroscientist and a professor in the Department of Psychology at the University of Illinois at Urbana-Champaign. He is affiliated with the Neuroscience Program, Program of Ecology, Evolution, & Conservation Biology, the Carl R. Woese Institute for Genomic Biology, and the Neurotech group at Beckman Institute for Advanced Science and Technology. After receiving a Bachelor of Science in biology at Stanford University, Rhodes obtained a PhD in zoology in 2002 from University of Wisconsin–Madison, under the supervision of Theodore Garland, Jr. After completing a postdoctoral fellowship at Oregon Health & Science University, he held a position as an instructor at Lewis & Clark College for a year before accepting a full-time faculty position in 2005 in the biological division of the Department of Psychology at the University of Illinois. His lab investigates a broad array of topics in the field of neuroscience with particular emphasis in exercise-induced hippocampal neurogenesis, neural circuitry involved in addictive behaviors, and brain plasticity in clownfish.

Research 
Rhodes research interests relate to neuronal plasticity. One interest includes understanding the role of voluntary exercise via wheel running in inducing the formation of new neurons in the dentate gyrus of the hippocampus. A major goal of this research would be to understand the biological organization, from gene and protein expressions, that regulate neurogenesis in the hippocampus.

Rhodes was one of the developers of the Drinking in the Dark model in mice. In this model, a specific mouse strain is found to voluntarily drink to the levels of intoxication. Many drugs used to treat alcoholism in humans have been shown to lead to reduced ethanol consumption in mice used in this model.

Another interest includes understanding changes in neural circuitry due to drug addiction. Research from his lab has shown that adult and adolescent mice given equal amounts of cocaine display significant differences in locomotor stimulation. His research has also shown that voluntary behaviors such as exercise could activate the same neurobiological pathways as alcohol and drug addiction. Most recently, his lab is investigating the impact of exercise on drug associative learning. As a career project, Rhodes tries to understand the evolution of behavior by selectively breeding for hyperactivity in mice. The overall goal is to identify how genes regulate multiple levels of biological organization.

Currently, Rhodes has also established a marine biology laboratory to research brain plasticity in clownfish undergoing sex change as a result of removal of the largest female from the group.

Awards and honors 
 Young Scientist Award, International Behavioural and Neural Genetics Society (2008)
 Evelyn Satinoff Professorial Scholar in Psychology (2013)

Notable publications

References

External links
 

1972 births
Living people
21st-century American psychologists
University of Wisconsin–Madison alumni
Stanford University alumni
Scientists from New York City
University of Illinois faculty
Lewis & Clark College faculty
American neuroscientists